Aliabad (also Romanized as ‘Alīābād) is a village in Kamazan-e Sofla Rural District, Zand District, Malayer County, Hamadan Province, Iran. At the 2006 census, its population was 18, in 4 families.

References 

Populated places in Malayer County